William H. Seevers (1820–1895) was a justice of the Iowa Supreme Court from February 27, 1876, to December 31, 1888, appointed from Mahaska County, Iowa.

References

External links

Justices of the Iowa Supreme Court
1820 births
1895 deaths
19th-century American judges